Piotr Oliver Celeban (born June 25, 1985 in Szczecin) is a Polish former professional footballer who currently serves as a fitness coach for Śląsk Wrocław II. Although primarily a central defender, when needed he operated as a right-back. He is known for his powerful heading and goal scoring ability. Besides Poland, he has played in Romania.

Club career
Celeban made his first appearance in Ekstraklasa in May 2005 against Górnik Łęczna.

Vaslui

2012–13 season
On 20 June 2012, fVaslui announced that they had reached an agreement to sign Celeban on a free transfer from Śląsk Wrocław. He signed a four-year contract and was handed the number 5 shirt. On 4 July, he made his debut for Vaslui in a 9–1 win in a preseason friendly over Bischoffen. He made his Liga I debut for Vaslui on 22 July in a 2–2 draw with Rapid București. Despite playing as a right back in Vaslui's opening against Rapid, Celeban established himself in the central defence alongside Cape Verde international Fernando Varela. Celeban scored his first goal for Vaslui on 27 August in a 3–1 win against Steaua București. On 1 September, Celeban scored a late header against Viitorul Constanța, assisted by a cross from Dacian Varga. Celeban made it 2–2 which also was the final score. On 3 November, he scored a brace, bringing his tally to 4 goals in 10 league games, as Vaslui defeated Ceahlăul Piatra Neamț 4–3. On 1 April 2013, he scored another brace in a 3–2 win against Viitorul Constanța, which ended Vaslui's run of five games without a win. Celeban continued to impress and scored with a header his seventh league goal of the season against Dinamo București. He managed to finish as Vaslui's top goalscorer with 7 goals, alongside team captain Lucian Sânmărtean. He was also Liga I's top scorer defender and Liga I's top header scorer with 5 goals, alongside Takayuki Seto and Bojan Golubović. Celeban was selected for the ProSport Team of the Year alongside teammate Zhivko Milanov.

2013–14 season
Celeban scored Vaslui's first goal of the season on 5 August against CFR Cluj with a 4th-minute header from Adrian Sălăgeanu's corner. The final score was established in the 33rd minute as 4–0. On 19 August, Celeban scored against Săgeata Năvodari at Municipal, with a 26th-minute header giving Vaslui a 1–0 win.

Career statistics

Club

Statistics accurate as of match played 24 September 2019

International career
He debuted for the Poland national football team in the friendly versus Serbia on December 14, 2008.

Honours

Club
Śląsk Wrocław
Ekstraklasa: 2011–12
Ekstraklasa Cup: 2009

Individual
Vaslui Player of the Season (1): 2012-13

Family
Celeban's brother Adam is also a professional football player who plays for Pogoń Szczecin.

References

External links
 
 
 

1985 births
Living people
Sportspeople from Szczecin
Polish footballers
Poland international footballers
Ekstraklasa players
II liga players
III liga players
Liga I players
Pogoń Szczecin players
Śląsk Wrocław players
Korona Kielce players
FC Vaslui players
Polish expatriate footballers
Expatriate footballers in Romania
Polish expatriate sportspeople in Romania
Association football defenders
Poland youth international footballers
Poland under-21 international footballers